Folsom Stage Line is a 3 line transit system serving the City of Folsom, CA. Folsom Stage connects to many schools, shopping malls, as well as the SacRT Gold line light rail. Daily operations were taken over by SacRT on February 4, 2019, however service remained unchanged.

References

Folsom, California
Transportation in California